140 (one hundred [and] forty) is the natural number following 139 and preceding 141.

In mathematics

140 is an abundant number and a harmonic divisor number. It is the sum of the squares of the first seven integers, which makes it a square pyramidal number.

140 is an odious number because it has an odd number of ones in its binary representation. The sum of Euler's totient function φ(x) over the first twenty-one integers is 140.

140 is a repdigit in bases 13, 19, 27, 34, 69, and 139.

In other fields
140 is also:
 The number of varieties of ashes from different varieties of pipe, cigar, and cigarette tobacco included in the Sherlock Holmes monograph.
 The former Twitter entry-character limit, a well-known characteristic of the service (based on the text messaging limit)
 A film, based on the Twitter entry-character limit, created and edited by Frank Kelly of Ireland
 The age that Job died at
 The atomic number of unquadnilium, a temporary chemical element
 PRO 140 antibody found on T lymphocytes of the human immune system
 Telephone directory assistance in Egypt
 A video game developed by Jeppe Carlsen
The BPM (tempo) of the music genre Dubstep

See also
 List of highways numbered 140
 United Nations Security Council Resolution 140
 United States Supreme Court cases, Volume 140

References

External links

 The Natural Number 140
 The Number 140 at The Database of Number Correlations

Integers